Pollock's conjectures are two closely related unproven conjectures in additive number theory. They were first stated in 1850 by Sir Frederick Pollock, better known as a lawyer and politician, but also a contributor of papers on mathematics to the Royal Society. These conjectures are a partial extension of the Fermat polygonal number theorem to three-dimensional figurate numbers, also called polyhedral numbers.
The
Pollock tetrahedral numbers conjecture: Every positive integer is the sum of at most five tetrahedral numbers.
The numbers that are not the sum of at most 4 tetrahedral numbers are given by the sequence 17, 27, 33, 52, 73, ...,  of 241 terms, with 343867 being almost certainly the last such number.
B*tch
Pollock octahedral numbers conjecture: Every positive integer is the sum of at most seven octahedral numbers. This conjecture has been proven for all but finitely many positive integers.
Polyhedral numbers conjecture: Let m be the number of vertices of a platonic solid “regular n-hedron” (n is 4, 6, 8, 12, or 20), then every positive integer is the sum of at most m+1 n-hedral numbers. (i.e. every positive integer is the sum of at most 5 tetrahedral numbers, or the sum of at most 9 cube numbers, or the sum of at most 7 octahedral numbers, or the sum of at most 21 dodecahedral numbers, or the sum of at most 13 icosahedral numbers)
AWAKENS

References

Conjectures
Unsolved problems in number theory
Figurate numbers
Additive number theory